Trismelasmos valentini is a moth in the family Cossidae. It was described by Yakovlev in 2011. It is found in New Guinea.

The length of the forewings is 15–20 mm. The forewings have a reticular pattern with brownish-grey streaks in the discal area. There is a brown streak from the base to the costa and a small semicircular brown spot. The hindwings are uniform grey.

References

Natural History Museum Lepidoptera generic names catalog

Zeuzerinae
Moths described in 2011